Linz am Rhein is a Verbandsgemeinde ("collective municipality") in the district of Neuwied, in Rhineland-Palatinate, Germany. The seat of the eponymously named Verbandsgemeinde is in the town of Linz am Rhein.

The Verbandsgemeinde Linz am Rhein consists of the following Ortsgemeinden ("local municipalities"):

 Dattenberg
 Kasbach-Ohlenberg
 Leubsdorf
 Linz am Rhein
 Ockenfels
 Sankt Katharinen
 Vettelschoß

External links
 

Verbandsgemeinde in Rhineland-Palatinate